Manoel Jacintho Coelho (December 30, 1903 – January 13, 1991) was a Brazilian writer and the founder of the religious cult Rational Culture.

Life 
Manoel Jacintho Coelho was born to a musician family in Rio de Janeiro. His father, Manoel, was a conductor and his mother, Rosa Maria, was a piano teacher. When he was thirteen, Manoel Jacinto was already a guitarist. The seven-string guitar has become one of its specialties.

At the age of eighteen, he joined the Brazilian Army, the 1st Heavy Machine Gun Company at the Deodoro barracks in Rio de Janeiro.

He worked for many years in the Ministry of Foreign Affairs, Itamaraty Palace, in Rio de Janeiro.

Career 
On October 4, 1935, he began the elaboration of the Rational Culture composed of 1,000 volumes and entitled "Universe in Disenchantment", which he would only conclude on December 5, 1990, shortly before his death. The books were divided into five parts: 
 1st - Work, composed of 21 volumes, 
 2nd - Replica, composed of 21 volumes, 
 3rd - Replica, composed of 21 volumes, 
 4th - Historic, composed of 934 volumes and
 5th - Amarelões, composed of 3 volumes edited between 1935 and 1938.

Courses
The sixty-nine courses (subjects) covered by his encyclopedia are divided into two categories: those known to humanity, and those still unknown to humanity.

41 courses known to humanity:

 
28 courses unknown to humanity:

Awards 
He received several national and international awards, including the Inconfidência Medal by the state of Minas Gerais on April 21, 1986, and Medalha Doutor “Ulisses Guimarães”, the homage of the OPB - Order of Brazilian Parliamentarians - granted to Mrs. Atna Jacintho Coelho in memoriam of Mr. Manoel Jacintho Coelho - received on June 7, 2005.

References

See also 
 List of literary awards
 Rationality

1903 births
1991 deaths
People from Rio de Janeiro (city)
Brazilian religious leaders